Anthrax immune globulin, tradename Anthrasil, is a human immune globulin that is used in combination with antibiotics to treat anthrax. It was developed by Cangene and purchased in 2011 by the Biomedical Advanced Research and Development Authority (BARDA) under Project Bioshield. On 24 March 2015 it was granted approval by the United States Food and Drug Administration for use in treating inhalation anthrax in conjunction with antibiotics.


Preparation
Anthrax immune globulin is prepared from the plasma of donors who have been vaccinated against anthrax.

Safety and efficacy testing 
Due to the ethical and feasibility concerns with testing the efficacy of anthrax immune globulin in humans, it was tested in rabbits and monkeys under the FDA's animal efficacy rule. Following efficacy testing, anthrax immune globulin was tested for safety in human volunteers, where the most common side effects were headache, back pain, nausea and infusion site pain and swelling.

References 

Antibodies
Blood products
Medical treatments
Polyclonal antibodies